New Zealand Knights Football Club is Australian professional association football club based in Auckland, New Zealand. The club was formed in 2004. They became the first team to compete in the A-League as a club from New Zealand.

Key
The table includes results of matches played by New Zealand Knights FC in the A-League (finals matches not included).
The name used for each opponent is the name they had when New Zealand Knights most recently played a league match against them. Results against each opponent include results against that club under any former name.
The columns headed "First" and "Last" contain the first and most recent seasons in which New Zealand Knights played league matches against each opponent.
P = matches played; W = matches won; D = matches drawn; L = matches lost; Win% = percentage of total matches won

All-time league record

References

New Zealand Knights FC
New Zealand football club records and statistics
Association football league records by opponent